Starnes is a surname. Notable people with the surname include:

Charles J. Starnes (1912–1993), of Michigan
Colin Starnes, professor and author
Cortlandt Starnes (1864–1934)
Donna Feore (born 1963), Canadian choreographer and theatre director born Donna Starnes
Edgar V. Starnes, Republican member of the North Carolina General Assembly
Henry Starnes (1816–1896), Quebec businessman
Joe Starnes (1895–1962), congressional representative from Alabama
Kalib Starnes (born 1975)
Paul M. Starnes (born 1934), American politician
Todd Starnes, American conservative writer and commentator